Suta gaikhorstorum, also known as the Pilbara hooded snake, is a species of venomous snake that is endemic to Australia. The specific epithet gaikhorstorum honours naturalists Klaas and Mieke Gaikhorst of the Armadale Reptile & Wildlife Centre.

Description
The species grows to an average of about 35–36 cm in length, occasionally up to 46 cm. Body colouration is mainly a light to rich reddish-brown with a dark grey to black hood.

Distribution and habitat
The species is found in the Pilbara region of Western Australia, especially in the Hamersley Range. It occurs in heavy, often stony, soils in mulga and eucalypt woodlands with a Triodia understorey. The type locality is 5 km south of the Mount Tom Price mine.

References

 
gaikhorstorum
Snakes of Australia
Endemic fauna of Australia
Reptiles of Western Australia
Reptiles described in 2020